Jacqueline 'Cassie' Sumfest (born December 10, 1998) is a field hockey player from the United States, who plays as a defender.

Personal life
Cassie Sumfest was born and raised in Lewisburg, Pennsylvania.

She studied her major in business administration at the University of North Carolina.

Career

Domestic leagues
In 2022 Sumfest travelled to Australia to play for the Tassie Tigers in the Sultana Bran Hockey One League.

National team
Sumfest made her debut for the national team in 2021, during a test series against Canada in Chula Vista.

She has since gone on to appear in season three of the FIH Pro League and at the 2022 Pan American Cup in Santiago.

References

External links

Cassie Sumfest at Hockey Australia

1998 births
Living people
American female field hockey players
Female field hockey defenders